Circle is the second album by Japanese pop singer Kaela Kimura, released on March 8, 2006.

Track listing

References

2006 albums
Kaela Kimura albums
Japanese-language albums